The English football transfer window for winter 2002–03 ran from 1 January 2003 until 1 February 2003, although a few transfers took place prior to that date. Players without a club may join one at any time, either during or in between transfer windows. Clubs below Premier League level may also sign players on loan at any time. If need be, clubs may sign a goalkeeper on an emergency loan, if all others are unavailable. The decision to introduce restrictions on the period that clubs could buy and sell players was controversial. Some owners were worried that it could harm clubs with smaller squads that were in financial difficulty, particularly in the wake of the collapse of ITV Digital, which had been funding football league teams. Players who were out of contract before 31 August 2002 were available for transfer, however, under the FIFA regulations.

The winter transfer window, which was introduced for the first time this season, was relatively quiet for the first 30 days, with 107 deals totalling £17.54 million. Jonathan Woodgate's transfer from Leeds United to Newcastle United on 31 January was the most expensive transfer at £9 million. Malcolm Christie, Jamie Clapham, Robbie Fowler, Danny Higginbotham, Mart Poom, David Prutton, Michael Ricketts, Chris Riggott, David Sommeil and Matthew Upson all moved clubs for more than £1 million.

Transfers
Only moves featuring at least one Premier League or First Division club are listed. The list is complete, although sometimes loan spells that were extended are covered as a single transfer.

Notes

 Christie and Riggott joined Middlesbrough in a combined deal worth £5 million. Christie signed for Middlesbrough immediately, while Riggott initially joined on loan before making a permanent move.
 Charvet left Manchester City by mutual consent in October 2002. He signed for Sochaux in January.

References
General

Specific

External links
Telegraph transfer list - 4 February, John Ley
BBC article on Harry Redknapp's spending

transfer
Winter 2002-03
Football transfers winter 2002–03